An electronic component is any basic discrete device or physical entity in an electronic system used to affect electrons or their associated fields. Electronic components are mostly industrial products, available in a singular form and are not to be confused with electrical elements, which are conceptual abstractions representing idealized electronic components and elements.

Electronic components have a number of electrical terminals or leads. These leads connect to other electrical components, often over wire, to create an electronic circuit with a particular function (for example an amplifier, radio receiver, or oscillator). Basic electronic components may be packaged discretely, as arrays or networks of like components, or integrated inside of packages such as semiconductor integrated circuits, hybrid integrated circuits, or thick film devices. The following list of electronic components focuses on the discrete version of these components, treating such packages as components in their own right.

Classification
Components can be classified as passive, active, or electromechanic. The strict physics definition treats passive components as ones that cannot supply energy themselves, whereas a battery would be seen as an active component since it truly acts as a source of energy.

However, electronic engineers who perform circuit analysis use a more restrictive definition of passivity. When only concerned with the energy of signals, it is convenient to ignore the so-called DC circuit and pretend that the power supplying components such as transistors or integrated circuits is absent (as if each such component had its own battery built in), though it may in reality be supplied by the DC circuit. Then, the analysis only concerns the AC circuit, an abstraction that ignores DC voltages and currents (and the power associated with them) present in the real-life circuit. This fiction, for instance, lets us view an oscillator as "producing energy" even though in reality the oscillator consumes even more energy from a DC power supply, which we have chosen to ignore. Under that restriction, we define the terms as used in circuit analysis as:
 Active components rely on a source of energy (usually from the DC circuit, which we have chosen to ignore) and usually can inject power into a circuit, though this is not part of the definition. Active components include amplifying components such as transistors, triode vacuum tubes (valves), and tunnel diodes.
 Passive components cannot introduce net energy into the circuit. They also cannot rely on a source of power, except for what is available from the (AC) circuit they are connected to. As a consequence, they cannot amplify (increase the power of a signal), although they may increase a voltage or current (such as is done by a transformer or resonant circuit). Passive components include two-terminal components such as resistors, capacitors, inductors, and transformers.
 Electromechanical components can carry out electrical operations by using moving parts or by using electrical connections

Most passive components with more than two terminals can be described in terms of two-port parameters that satisfy the principle of reciprocity—though there are rare exceptions. In contrast, active components (with more than two terminals) generally lack that property.

Active components

Semiconductors

Transistors 
Transistors were considered the invention of the twentieth century that changed electronic circuits forever. A transistor is a semiconductor device used to amplify and switch electronic signals and electrical power.

Field-effect transistors (FET)
MOSFET (metal–oxide–semiconductor FET) – by far the most widely manufactured electronic component (also known as MOS transistor)
PMOS (p-type MOS)
NMOS (n-type MOS)
CMOS (complementary MOS)
Power MOSFET
LDMOS (lateral diffused MOSFET)
MuGFET (multi-gate field-effect transistor)
FinFET (fin field-effect transistor)
TFT (thin-film transistor)
FeFET (ferroelectric field-effect transistor)
CNTFET (carbon nanotube field-effect transistor)
JFET (junction field-effect transistor) – N-channel or P-channel
SIT (static induction transistor)
MESFET (metal semiconductor FET)
HEMT (high-electron-mobility transistor)
Composite transistors
BiCMOS (bipolar CMOS)
IGBT (Insulated-gate bipolar transistor)
Other transistors
Bipolar junction transistor (BJT, or simply "transistor") – NPN or PNP
Photo transistor – amplified photodetector
Darlington transistor – NPN or PNP
Photo Darlington – amplified photodetector
Sziklai pair (compound transistor, complementary Darlington)
Thyristors
Silicon-controlled rectifier (SCR) – passes current only after triggered by a sufficient control voltage on its gate
TRIAC (TRIode for Alternating Current) – bidirectional SCR
Unijunction transistor (UJT)
Programmable Unijunction transistor (PUT)
SITh (static induction thyristor)

Diodes 
Conduct electricity easily in one direction, among more specific behaviors.
Diode, rectifier, diode bridge
Schottky diode (hot carrier diode) – super fast diode with lower forward voltage drop
Zener diode – allows current to flow "backwards" when a specific set voltage is reached.
Transient voltage suppression diode (TVS), unipolar or bipolar – used to absorb high-voltage spikes
Varicap, tuning diode, varactor, variable capacitance diode – a diode whose AC capacitance varies according to the DC voltage applied.

Laser diode
Light-emitting diode (LED) – a diode that emits light
Photodiode – passes current in proportion to incident light
Avalanche photodiode – photodiode with internal gain
Solar Cell, photovoltaic cell, PV array or panel – produces power from light
DIAC (diode for alternating current), Trigger Diode, SIDAC) – often used to trigger an SCR
Constant-current diode
Step recovery diode
Tunnel diode - very fast diode based on quantum mechanical tunneling

Integrated circuits 
Integrated Circuits can serve a variety of purposes, including acting as a timer, performing digital to analog conversion, performing amplification, or being used for logical operations. 
 Integrated circuit (IC)
 MOS integrated circuit (MOS IC)
 Hybrid integrated circuit (hybrid IC)
 Mixed-signal integrated circuit
 Three-dimensional integrated circuit (3D IC)
 Digital electronics
 Logic gate
 Microcontroller
 Analog circuit
 Hall-effect sensor – senses a magnetic field
 Current sensor – senses a current through it

Programmable devices 
 Programmable logic device
 Field-programmable gate array (FPGA)
 Complex programmable logic device (CPLD)
 Field-programmable analog array (FPAA)

Optoelectronic devices 
 Opto-electronics
 Opto-isolator, opto-coupler, photo-coupler – photodiode, BJT, JFET, SCR, TRIAC, zero-crossing TRIAC, open collector IC, CMOS IC, solid state relay (SSR)
 Slotted optical switch, opto switch, optical switch
 LED display – seven-segment display, sixteen-segment display, dot-matrix display

Display technologies 
Current:
 Filament lamp (indicator lamp)
 Vacuum fluorescent display (VFD) (preformed characters, 7 segment, starburst)
 Cathode ray tube (CRT) (dot matrix scan, radial scan (e.g. radar), arbitrary scan (e.g. oscilloscope)) (monochrome & colour)
 LCD (preformed characters, dot matrix) (passive, TFT) (monochrome, colour)
 Neon (individual, 7 segment display)
 LED (individual, 7 segment display, starburst display, dot matrix)
 Split-flap display (numeric, preprinted messages)
 Plasma display (dot matrix)
 OLED (similar to an LCD, but each pixel generates its own light, can be made flexible or transparent)
 Micro-LED (similar to OLED, but uses inorganic LEDs instead of organic ones, does not suffer from screen burn-in, however it cannot be made flexible or transparent)
Obsolete:
 Incandescent filament 7 segment display (aka 'Numitron')
 Nixie tube
 Dekatron (aka glow transfer tube)
 Magic eye tube indicator
 Penetron (a 2 colour see-through CRT)

Vacuum tubes (valves) 
A vacuum tube is based on current conduction through a vacuum (see Vacuum tube).
 Diode or rectifier tube
 Amplification
 Triode
 Tetrode
 Pentode
 Hexode
 Pentagrid (Heptode)
 Octode
 Traveling-wave tube
 Klystron
 Oscillation
Magnetron
 Reflex Klystron (obsolete)
 Carcinotron

Optical detectors or emitters
 Phototube or photodiode – tube equivalent of semiconductor photodiode
 Photomultiplier tube – phototube with internal gain
 Cathode ray tube (CRT) or television picture tube (obsolete)
 Vacuum fluorescent display (VFD) – modern non-raster sort of small CRT display
 Magic eye tube – small CRT display used as a tuning meter (obsolete)
 X-ray tube – generates x-rays

Discharge devices
 Gas discharge tube
 Ignitron
 Thyratron

Obsolete:
 Mercury arc rectifier
 Voltage regulator tube
 Nixie tube

Power sources 
Sources of electrical power:
 Battery – acid- or alkali-based power supply.
 Fuel cell – an electrochemical generator
 Power supply – usually a main hook-up
 Photovoltaic device – generates electricity from light
 Thermoelectric generator – generates electricity from temperature gradients
 Electrical generator – an electromechanical power source
 Piezoelectric generator - generates electricity from mechanical strain
 Van de Graaff generator - generates electricity from friction

Passive components
Components incapable of controlling current by means of another electrical signal are called passive devices. Resistors, capacitors, inductors, and transformers are all considered passive devices.

Resistors 

Pass current in proportion to voltage (Ohm's law) and oppose current.
 Resistor – fixed value
 Power resistor – larger to safely dissipate heat generated
 SIP or DIP resistor network – array of resistors in one package
 Variable resistor
 Rheostat – two-terminal variable resistor (often for high power)
 Potentiometer – three-terminal variable resistor (variable voltage divider)
 Trim pot – small potentiometer, usually for internal adjustments
 Thermistor – thermally sensitive resistor whose prime function is to exhibit a large, predictable and precise change in electrical resistance when subjected to a corresponding change in body temperature.
 Humistor – humidity-varied resistor
 Photoresistor
 Memristor
 Varistor, Voltage-dependent resistor, MOV – Passes current when excessive voltage is present
 Resistance wire, Nichrome wire – wire of high-resistance material, often used as a heating element
 Heater – heating element

Capacitors 

Capacitors store and release electrical charge. They are used for filtering power supply lines, tuning resonant circuits, and for blocking DC voltages while passing AC signals, among numerous other uses.
 Capacitor
 Integrated capacitors
 MIS capacitor
 Trench capacitor
 Fixed capacitors
 Ceramic capacitor
 Film capacitor
 Electrolytic capacitor
 Aluminum electrolytic capacitor
 Tantalum electrolytic capacitor
 Niobium electrolytic capacitor (Columbium capacitor)
 Polymer capacitor, OS-CON
 Supercapacitor (Electric double-layer capacitor)
 Nanoionic supercapacitor
 Lithium-ion capacitor
 Mica capacitor
 Vacuum capacitor
 Variable capacitor – adjustable capacitance
 Tuning capacitor – variable capacitor for tuning a radio, oscillator, or tuned circuit
 Trimmer capacitor – small variable capacitor for seldom or rare adjustments of LC-circuits
 Vacuum variable capacitor
 Capacitors for special applications
 Power capacitor
 Safety capacitor
 Filter capacitor
 Light-emitting capacitor (LEC)
 Motor capacitor
 Photoflash capacitor
 Reservoir capacitor / Bulk capacitor
 Coupling capacitor
 Decoupling capacitor / Buffer capacitor
 Bypass capacitor
 Pull capacitor / Padding capacitor
 Backup capacitor
 Switched capacitor
 Feedthrough capacitor
 Capacitor network (array)
 Varicap diode – AC capacitance varies according to the DC voltage applied

Integrated passive devices 

Integrated passive devices are passive devices integrated within one distinct package. They take up less space than equivalent combinations of discrete components.

Magnetic (inductive) devices 
Electrical components that use magnetism in the storage and release of electrical charge through current:
 Inductor, coil, choke
 Variable inductor
 Saturable inductor
 Transformer
 Magnetic amplifier (toroid)
 ferrite impedances, beads
 Motor / Generator
 Solenoid
 Loudspeaker and microphone

Memristor 
Electrical components that pass charge in proportion to magnetism or magnetic flux, and have the ability to retain a previous resistive state, hence the name of Memory plus Resistor.
 Memristor

Networks 
Components that use more than one type of passive component:
 RC network – forms an RC circuit, used in snubbers
 LC Network – forms an LC circuit, used in tunable transformers and RFI filters.

Transducers, sensors, detectors 
 Transducers generate physical effects when driven by an electrical signal, or vice versa.
 Sensors (detectors) are transducers that react to environmental conditions by changing their electrical properties or generating an electrical signal.
 The transducers listed here are single electronic components (as opposed to complete assemblies), and are passive (see Semiconductors and Tubes for active ones). Only the most common ones are listed here.
 Audio
 Loudspeaker – Electromagnetic or piezoelectric device to generate full audio
 Buzzer – Electromagnetic or piezoelectric sounder to generate tones
 Position, motion
 Linear variable differential transformer (LVDT) – Magnetic – detects linear position
 Rotary encoder, Shaft Encoder – Optical, magnetic, resistive or switches – detects absolute or relative angle or rotational speed
 Inclinometer – Capacitive – detects angle with respect to gravity
 Motion sensor, Vibration sensor
 Flow meter – detects flow in liquid or gas
 Force, torque
 Strain gauge – Piezoelectric or resistive – detects squeezing, stretching, twisting
 Accelerometer – Piezoelectric – detects acceleration, gravity
 Thermal
 Thermocouple, thermopile – Wires that generate a voltage proportional to delta temperature
 Thermistor – Resistor whose resistance changes with temperature, up PTC or down NTC
 Resistance Temperature Detector (RTD) – Wire whose resistance changes with temperature
 Bolometer – Device for measuring the power of incident electromagnetic radiation
 Thermal cutoff – Switch that is opened or closed when a set temperature is exceeded
 Magnetic field (see also Hall Effect in semiconductors)
 Magnetometer, Gauss meter
 Humidity
 Hygrometer
 Electromagnetic, light
 Photo resistor – Light dependent resistor (LDR)

Antennas
Antennas transmit or receive radio waves
Elemental dipole
Yagi
Phased array
Loop antenna
Parabolic dish
Log-periodic dipole array
Biconical
Feedhorn

Assemblies, modules 
Multiple electronic components assembled in a device that is in itself used as a component
 Oscillator
 Display devices
 Liquid crystal display (LCD)
 Digital voltmeters
 Filter

Prototyping aids 

Wire-wrap
Breadboard

Electromechanical

Piezoelectric devices, crystals, resonators 
Passive components that use piezoelectric effect:
 Components that use the effect to generate or filter high frequencies
 Crystal – a ceramic crystal used to generate precise frequencies (See the Modules class below for complete oscillators)
 Ceramic resonator – Is a ceramic crystal used to generate semi-precise frequencies
 Ceramic filter – Is a ceramic crystal used to filter a band of frequencies such as in radio receivers
 surface acoustic wave (SAW) filters
 Components that use the effect as mechanical transducers.
 Ultrasonic motor – Electric motor that uses the piezoelectric effects
 For piezo buzzers and microphones, see the Transducer class below

Microelectromechanical systems 

 Microelectromechanical systems
 Accelerometer
 Digital micromirror device

Terminals and connectors 
Devices to make electrical connection
 Terminal
 Connector
 Socket
 Screw terminal, Terminal Blocks
 Pin header

Cable assemblies 
Electrical cables with connectors or terminals at their ends
 Power cord
 Patch cord
 Test lead

Switches 
Components that can pass current ("closed") or break the current ("open"):
 Switch – Manually operated switch
 Electrical description: SPST, SPDT, DPST, DPDT, NPNT (general)
 Technology: slide switches, toggle switches, rocker switches, rotary switches, pushbutton switches
 Keypad – Array of pushbutton switches
 DIP switch – Small array of switches for internal configuration settings
 Footswitch – Foot-operated switch
 Knife switch – Switch with unenclosed conductors
 Micro switch – Mechanically activated switch with snap action
 Limit switch – Mechanically activated switch to sense limit of motion
 Mercury switch – Switch sensing tilt
 Centrifugal switch – Switch sensing centrifugal force due to rate of rotation
 Relay or contactor – Electro-mechanically operated switch (see also solid state relay above)
 Reed switch – Magnetically activated switch
 Thermostat – Thermally activated switch
 Humidistat – Humidity activated switch
 Circuit breaker – Switch opened in response to excessive current: a resettable fuse
Disconnector – Switch used in high- and medium-voltage applications for maintenance of other devices or isolation of circuits
Transfer switch – Switch that toggles a load between two sources

Protection devices 
Passive components that protect circuits from excessive currents or voltages:
 Fuse – over-current protection, one time use
 Circuit breaker – resettable fuse in the form of a mechanical switch
 Resettable fuse or PolySwitch – circuit breaker action using solid state device
 Ground-fault protection or residual-current device – circuit breaker sensitive to mains currents passing to ground
 Metal oxide varistor (MOV), surge absorber, TVS – Over-voltage protection
 Inrush current limiter – protection against initial Inrush current
 Gas discharge tube – protection against high voltage surges
 Spark gap – electrodes with a gap to arc over at a high voltage
 Lightning arrester – spark gap used to protect against lightning strikes
Recloser – automatic switch that opens on an overcurrent (fault) condition, then closes to check if the fault is cleared, and repeats this process a specified number of times before maintaining the open position until it is manually closed
Arc-fault circuit interrupter – circuit breaker that protects against arcs
Network protector – protective device that disconnects a distribution transformer when energy flow reverses direction
Magnetic starter – electromechanical switch used in motors

Mechanical accessories 
 Enclosure (electrical)
 Heat sink
 Fan

Other 
 Printed circuit boards
 Lamp
 Waveguide

Obsolete 
 Carbon amplifier (see Carbon microphones used as amplifiers)
 Carbon arc (negative resistance device)
 Dynamo (historic rf generator)
 Coherer

Standard symbols 

On a circuit diagram, electronic devices are represented by conventional symbols. Reference designators are applied to the symbols to identify the components.

See also 

 Circuit design
 Circuit diagram
 Operational amplifier
 7400-series integrated circuits
 E-series of preferred numbers
 Lumped element model
 Counterfeit electronic components
 Electrical element
 Electronic mixer
Electronic components' Datasheets
 IEEE 315-1975
 Solid-state electronics
 History of electronic engineering

References

 
Components